Rufus Henry Fitzgerald (November 20, 1890 – April 11, 1966) was the eleventh Chancellor (1945–1955) of the University of Pittsburgh.

He graduated from the University of Tennessee-Knoxville in 1919. He became a member of the Sigma Chi Fraternity as an undergraduate.

His administration is best remembered for its smooth ten-year tenure: reinstatement of athletic scholarships at the university, expansion of the student body, especially returning veterans after World War II, and the worldwide success of Jonas Salk's polio vaccine developed at Pitt's medical center.

Fitzgerald Field House, an athletic venue on the Pitt campus which opened during his tenure, is named in his honor.

References

External links
 Files of Fitzgerald at the University of Pittsburgh

1890 births
1966 deaths
Chancellors of the University of Pittsburgh
Place of birth missing
Place of death missing
20th-century American academics